Olivier Alary is a Montreal-based musician and composer who has released his own recordings, as well as composing for film and exhibitions.

A native of Toulouse, France, and a former student of architecture, Alary created Ensemble in 1998 as a musical persona through which to explore the encounter between melodic noise and disjointed pop. He moved to London to study music and in 2000 he released his first album Sketch Proposals under the name Ensemble with Rephlex Records.

Sketch Proposals caught the attention of Björk, and Alary's remixes of three of her songs – "Sun in My Mouth", "Cocoon" and "Mouth's Cradle" – were released as B-sides. He went on to co-write the song "Desired Constellation" with Björk on her 2004 album Medúlla.

Alary's follow-up album, the self-titled Ensemble, blends symphonic wall-of-sound with intimate folk-pop vocals, and was released in 2006. It features vocal performances by Chan Marshall (of Cat Power fame), Lou Barlow and Mileece; drums by Adam Pierce;  and orchestral arrangements by Johannes Malfatti, performed by Germany's Babelsberg Film Orchestra.

Ensemble's third album Excerpts was  released in January 2011. A beautiful, sophisticated record of orchestrated pop songs on the theme of fictional and false memories, the album features collaborators Johannes Malfatti and vocalist Darcy Conroy.

Olivier has also composed music for several exhibitions at London's Victoria & Albert Museum; contributed to an installation by Doug Aitken at the Centre Georges Pompidou in Paris; and has received an honorary mention at the Ars Electronica Festival for his project Chlorgeschlecht. He has also collaborated with photographer Nick Knight. Since 2007, he has also provided soundtrack for several feature-length films and documentaries, some of which have received prestigious awards and screenings in Europe, the US and China.

Discography

Albums

u, i (as Olivier Alary; collaborative project with Johannes Malfatti) (130701)
Fiction / Non-Fiction (as Olivier Alary) (130701)
Pieces for Sine Wave Oscillators (as Olivier Alary) (LINE)
Excerpts (as Ensemble) (FatCat Records)
Ensemble (as Ensemble) (FatCat Records)
Sketch Proposals (as Ensemble) (Rephlex Records)

Eps
Envies d'Avalanches (FatCat Records)
Disown, delete (FatCat Records)

Collaborations
"Sun in My Mouth", recomposed by Ensemble, first Björk remix (Vespertine)
"Cocoon retangled by Ensemble, second Björk remix (Vespertine)
"Mouth's Cradle" recomposed by Ensemble, third Björk remix (Medúlla)
"Desired Constellation" on Björk's album (Medúlla)
"Chlorgeschlecht – Unyoga" (honorary mention at Ars Electronica)

Selected film soundtracks

2020: Night of the Kings, fiction film directed by Philippe Lacôte
2019: La femme de mon frère, fiction film directed by Monia Chokri
2018: The Great Darkened Days, fiction film directed by Maxime Giroux
2018: First Match, fiction film directed by Olivia Newman
2017: Allure, fiction film directed by Carlos and Jason Sanchez
2016: Resurrecting Hassan, documentary directed by Carlo Guillermo Proto
2016: Oh What a Wonderful Feeling, short fiction film directed by François Jaros
2015: Ville-Marie, fiction film directed by Guy Édoin
2014: Felix and Meira, fiction film directed by Maxime Giroux
2014: Corbo, fiction film directed by Mathieu Denis
2014: Yo, fiction film directed by Matias Meyer
2014: Juanicas, documentary film directed by Karina Garcia Casanova
2012: China Heavyweight, documentary directed by Yung Chang
2011: Jo for Jonathan (Jo pour Jonathan), fiction film directed by Maxime Giroux
2009: Last Train Home, documentary directed by Lixin Fan
2008: The Dreaming, short fiction film directed by Anthony Green
2007: Up the Yangtze, documentary directed by Yung Chang

References

External links

 

Living people
French emigrants to Quebec
Musicians from Toulouse
1975 births
French film score composers
Canadian film score composers
Musicians from Montreal
FatCat Records artists